Vidreres is a municipality in the comarca of La Selva, the province of Girona and autonomous community of Catalonia, Spain.

The name of Vitrariis appears in the 12th century and it meant 'vidriera' or 'vitralleria', which in english means stained glass. But the origin or the cause of that name is yet unknown.

A really popular fest is "El Ranxo", the name of a soup with rice as the main ingredient, that it is made on the Tuesday of the week of carnival, for all the villagers.

Every year it takes place the Ludibàsquet, a basketball fest.

Some of the places of interest that you can visit are the Sant Iscle's castle, from the 12th century. Or also the church of Santa Susana, of romanic origin, located in Caulès, a mountain in Vidreres.

References

External links
 Government data pages 

Municipalities in Selva